Bryan Gibson (born Bryan Frederick Gibson; December 31, 1980) is an American record producer, composer, and multi-instrumentalist, best known as the cellist, pianist, and mandolinist, accompanying Chris Cornell on the "Higher Truth" world tour. He is also known as the founder, songwriter, and lead guitarist for the rock band I Nine.

He has over 20 years of performance experience touring with Aslyn, Owen Beverly, Tim Brantley, Jay Clifford, Chris Cornell, and Matisyahu, and was also principal cellist of the USC Symphony while he studied at the University of South Carolina.

References

1980 births
Living people
Record producers from South Carolina
American multi-instrumentalists
American male composers
21st-century American composers
21st-century American male musicians